Abisha Collins "Bosh"  Pritchard (September 10, 1919 – November 7, 1996) was an American football halfback in the National Football League who played for ten seasons for the Cleveland Rams, the Philadelphia Eagles and the New York Giants. He appeared in 60 NFL games, scored 25 touchdowns, and compiled 1,730 rushing yards, 1,168 receiving yards, 1,072 punt return yards, and 938 kickoff return yards. He led the NFL in 1949 with an average of 6.0 yards per rushing carry and in 1946 with an average of 11.3 yards per touch.  He also led the NFL in 1948 with five fumble recoveries. He attended Georgia Tech and the Virginia Military Institute.

Pritchard served as a commentator on Eagles television broadcasts for CBS in the late 1950s and early 1960s.

He was inducted into the Virginia Sports Hall of Fame in 1997.

See also
 List of NCAA major college football yearly punt and kickoff return leaders

References

External links

1919 births
1996 deaths
People from Windsor, North Carolina
American football running backs
Cleveland Rams players
Georgia Tech Yellow Jackets football players
National Football League announcers
New York Giants players
Philadelphia Eagles announcers
Philadelphia Eagles players
Players of American football from North Carolina